The Faculty of Classics, previously the Faculty of Literae Humaniores, is a subdivision of the University of Oxford concerned with the teaching and research of classics. The teaching of classics at Oxford has been going on for 900 years, and was at the centre of nearly all its undergraduates' education well into the twentieth century.

The Faculty was renamed "Classics" in 2001 after Philosophy, which had previously been a sub-faculty, became a faculty in its own right. The Faculty of Classics is divided into two sub-faculties of Classical Languages & Literature, and Ancient History & Classical Archaeology. The Faculty organises teaching and research - the main undergraduate programme being known as Literae Humaniores. It also runs a BA programme in Classical Archaeology and Ancient History. The Faculty of Classics is part of the Humanities Division. It runs projects including the Oxyrhynchus Papyrus Project and the Archive of Performances of Greek and Roman Drama. It is the largest Classics department at any university in the world.

Location
The Faculty is based at the Ioannou School for Research in Classical and Byzantine Studies on St. Giles', next to the Ashmolean Museum and Sackler Library. These three therefore form an informal 'Classics Triangle' in Oxford. The Stelios Ioannou Centre for Classical and Byzantine Studies was opened in 2007 and designed by van Heyningen and Haward Architects. It provides research and teaching facilities for the Faculty and involved demolishing the old subsidiary buildings, while the significant parts of the existing buildings were retained to create a new central atrium.

Research
The Faculty runs a large number of research projects, including:

Oxyrhynchus Papyri
Dictionary of Medieval Latin from British Sources
Classical Art Research Centre (which includes the Beazley Archive)
Lexicon of Greek Personal Names
Roman Inscriptions of Britain
Sphakia Survey
Byzantine Ceramics
Centre for the Study of Ancient Documents
Archive of Performances of Greek and Roman Drama
Bibliotheca Academica Translationum
Roman Provincial Coinage in the Antonine Period
Research Archive for Greek and Roman Sculpture
Greek Literary Hands of the Roman Period
Imaging Papyri
Reception of Greek Literature 300 BC-800 AD: Traditions of the Fragment
e-Science and Ancient Documents Project
The Oxford Roman Economy Project (OxRep)
The Monumenta Asiae Minoris Antiqua XI
Social and Cultural Construction of Emotions: The Greek Paradigm
Manar al-Athar photo archive

Notable academics

Statutory Professors:
 Camden Professor of Ancient History (currently Nicholas Purcell)
 Corpus Christi Professor of Latin (currently Tobias Reinhardt)
 Lincoln Professor of Classical Archaeology and Art (currently R.R.R. Smith)
 Regius Professor of Greek (Gregory Hutchinson)
 Wykeham Professor of Ancient History (currently Nino Luraghi)

Other notable current academics:

Rhiannon Ash
Anna Clark
Ursula Coope, Professor of Ancient Philosophy
Martin Goodman
Stephen Harrison
Simon Hornblower
Christopher Howgego
Irene Lemos
Jane Lightfoot
Fiona Macintosh, Professor of Classical Reception
Catherine Morgan
Rosalind Thomas, Professor of Greek History
Andrew Wilson

Notable former academics:

John Boardman
Myles Burnyeat
Averil Cameron
Barry Cunliffe
Jasper Griffin
Terence Irwin
Elizabeth Jeffreys
Donna Carol Kurtz
Robin Lane Fox
Hugh Lloyd-Jones
Fergus Millar
Christopher Pelling
Donald Russell
Oliver Taplin
Susan Treggiari
Martin Litchfield West
Stephanie West

References

External links 
 Official Website
 Dictionary of Medieval Latin from British Sources

Educational institutions established in 2001
Classics
2001 establishments in England